Lists of members of the Lok Sabha of India include:

 14th Lok Sabha 2004–2009,
List of members of the 14th Lok Sabha
 15th Lok Sabha 2009–2014,
List of members of the 15th Lok Sabha
 16th Lok Sabha 2014-2019, 
List of members of the 16th Lok Sabha
 17th Lok Sabha 2019–2024,
 List of members of the 17th Lok Sabha of India

or to the members of the:
 1st Lok Sabha 1952–1957, includes important members
 2nd Lok Sabha 1957–1962, includes important members
 3rd Lok Sabha 1962–1967, includes important members
 4th Lok Sabha 1967–1970, includes important members
 5th Lok Sabha 1971–1977, includes important members
 6th Lok Sabha 1977–1979, includes important members
 7th Lok Sabha 1980–1984, includes cabinet members
 8th Lok Sabha 1984–1989, includes important members
 9th Lok Sabha 1989–1991, includes important members
 10th Lok Sabha 1991–1996, includes important members
 11th Lok Sabha 1996–1997, includes members by state
 12th Lok Sabha 1998–1999, includes members by state
 13th Lok Sabha 1999–2004, includes members by state